Dejan Ivanov (born March 18, 1986) is a Bulgarian professional basketball player who plays for Levski Sofia of the Bulgarian NBL. He is also a longtime member of the Bulgarian national team.
He is Kaloyan's twin brother.

References

External links
 Dejan Ivanov at acb.com
 Dejan Ivanov at legabasket.it
 Dejan Ivanov at euroleague.net

1986 births
Living people
ABA League players
Auxilium Pallacanestro Torino players
BC Avtodor Saratov players
BC Levski Sofia players
BC Rytas players
Bucaneros de La Guaira players
Bulgarian expatriate basketball people in Italy
Bulgarian expatriate basketball people in Spain
Bulgarian men's basketball players
CB Estudiantes players
Gaziantep Basketbol players
Juvecaserta Basket players
KK Split players
KK Zadar players
Lega Basket Serie A players
Liga ACB players
Menorca Bàsquet players
New Basket Brindisi players
Pallacanestro Varese players
Pistoia Basket 2000 players
Power forwards (basketball)
Real Betis Baloncesto players
Sportspeople from Varna, Bulgaria
Sutor Basket Montegranaro players
Bulgarian twins
Twin sportspeople
Yeşilgiresun Belediye players